A spinning wheel is a device for spinning thread or yarn from fibres. It was fundamental to the cotton textile industry prior to the Industrial Revolution. It laid the foundations for later machinery such as the spinning jenny and spinning frame, which displaced the spinning wheel during the Industrial Revolution.

Function
The basic spinning of yarn involves taking a clump of fibres and teasing a bit of them out, then twisting it into a basic string shape. The spinner continues pulling and twisting to make it longer and longer, and to control the thickness. Thousands of years ago, people began doing this onto a stick, called a spindle, which was a very lengthy process.

The actual wheel part of a spinning wheel does not take the place of the spindle, instead it automates the twisting process, allowing one to "twist" the thread without having to constantly do so manually, and also the size of the wheel lets one more finely control the amount of twist. The thread still ends up on a spindle, just as it did before the invention of the wheel.

The wheel itself was originally free-moving, spun by a hand or foot reaching out and turning it directly. Eventually, simple mechanisms were created that let a person simply push at a pedal and keep the wheel turning at an even more constant rate. This mechanism has been the main source of technological progress for the spinning wheel, before the 18th century.

History

The history of the spinning wheel is disputed, with: 
 J.M Kenoyer, involved in the study of the Indus Valley Civilization speculating that the uniformity of the thread and tight weave from a clay impression indicates the use of a spinning wheel rather than drop spindles, but according to Mukhtar Ahmed, the spinning whorls used since prehistoric times by the Indus Valley people produce a tight weave. 
 Dieter Kuhn and Weiji Cheng propose the spinning wheel originated in Zhou dynasty China, in the first millennia BCE, are mentioned in Chinese dictionaries of the 2nd century CE, and in widespread use by c. 1090, with the earliest clear Chinese illustration of the machine dated to around 1270.
 C. Wayne Smith and J. Tom Cothren, propose the spinning wheel was invented in India as early as 500-1000 AD. 
 Arnold Pacey and Irfan Habib propose the spinning wheel was most likely invented in the Islamic world by the early 11th century. There is evidence pointing to the spinning wheel being known in the Islamic world by 1030, and the earliest clear illustration of the spinning wheel is from Baghdad, drawn in 1237. Arnold Pacey and Irfan Habib suggest that early references to cotton spinning in India are vague and do not clearly identify a wheel, but more likely refer to hand spinning, offering as the earliest unambiguous reference to a spinning wheel in India, 1350, is a passage in Abdul Malik Isami’s work, Futuh-us-Salatin, which proposes a woman’s place is at her Charkha.
 K. A. Nilakanta Sastri and Vijaya Ramaswamy suggest there is clear reference to the use of a spinning wheel (with a description of its parts) by the 12th century in India, by Kannada poet, Remmavve. 

The spinning wheel spread from the Islamic world to Europe by the 13th century, with the earliest European illustration dated to around 1280. In France, the spindle and distaff were not displaced until the mid 18th century.

The spinning wheel replaced the earlier method of hand spinning with a spindle. The first stage in mechanizing the process was mounting the spindle horizontally so it could be rotated by a cord encircling a large, hand-driven wheel. The great wheel is an example of this type, where the fibre is held in the left hand and the wheel slowly turned with the right. Holding the fibre at a slight angle to the spindle produced the necessary twist. The spun yarn was then wound onto the spindle by moving it so as to form a right angle with the spindle. This type of wheel, while known in Europe by the 14th century, was not in general use until later. The construction of the Great Wheel made it very good at creating long drawn soft fuzzy wools, but very difficult to create the strong smooth yarns needed to create warp for weaving. Spinning wheels ultimately did not develop the capability to spin a variety of yarns until the beginning of the 19th century and the mechanization of spinning.

In general, the spinning technology was known for a long time before being adopted by the majority of people, thus making it hard to fix dates of the improvements. In 1533, a citizen of Brunswick is said to have added a treadle, by which the spinner could rotate her spindle with one foot and have both hands free to spin. Leonardo da Vinci drew a picture of the flyer, which twists the yarn before winding it onto the spindle. During the 16th century a treadle wheel with flyer was in common use, and gained such names as the Saxony wheel and the flax wheel. It sped up production, as one needn't stop spinning to wind up the yarn.

According to Mark Elvin, 14th-century Chinese technical manuals describe an automatic water-powered spinning wheel. Comparable devices were not developed in Europe until the 18th century. However, it fell into disuse when fibre production shifted from hemp to cotton. It was forgotten by the 17th century. The decline of the automatic spinning wheel in China is an important part of Elvin's high level equilibrium trap theory to explain why there was no indigenous industrial Revolution in China despite its high levels of wealth and scientific knowledge.

On the eve of the Industrial revolution it took at least five spinners to supply one weaver.  Lewis Paul and John Wyatt first worked on the problem in 1738, patenting the Roller Spinning machine and the flyer-and-bobbin system, for drawing wool to a more even thickness. Using two sets of rollers that travelled at different speeds, yarn could be twisted and spun quickly and efficiently. However, they did not have much financial success. In 1771, Richard Arkwright used waterwheels to power looms for the production of cotton cloth, his invention becoming known as the water frame.

More modern spinning machines use a mechanical means to rotate the spindle, as well as an automatic method to draw out fibres, and devices to work many spindles together at speeds previously unattainable. Newer technologies that offer even faster yarn production include friction spinning, an open-end system, and air jets.

Types

Numerous types of spinning wheels exist, including:

 the great wheel also known as walking wheel or wool wheel for rapid long draw spinning of woolen-spun yarns; 
 the flax wheel, which is a double-drive wheel used with a distaff for spinning flax fibres for making linen; 
 saxony and upright wheels, all-purpose treadle driven wheels used to spin both woolen and worsted-spun yarns; and 
 the charkha, native to Asia.

Until the acceptance of rotor spinning wheel, all yarns were produced by aligning fibres through drawing techniques and then twisting the fibre together. With rotor spinning, the fibres in the roving are separated, thus opened, and then wrapped and twisted as the yarn is drawn out of the rotor cup.

Charkha

The tabletop or floor charkha is one of the oldest known forms of the spinning wheel. The charkha works similarly to the great wheel, with a drive wheel being turned by one hand, while the yarn is spun off the tip of the spindle with the other. The floor charkha and the great wheel closely resemble each other. With both, the spinning must stop in order to wind the yarn onto the spindle.

The word charkha, which has links with Persian  (Romanized: "charkh"), wheel, is related to the Sanskrit word for "circle" (cakra). The charkha was both a tool and a symbol of the Indian independence movement. The charkha, a small, portable, hand-cranked wheel, is ideal for spinning cotton and other fine, short-staple fibres, though it can be used to spin other fibres as well. The size varies, from that of a hardbound novel to the size of a briefcase, to a floor charkha. Leaders of the India's Freedom Struggle brought the charkha into wider use with their teachings. They hoped the charkha would assist the people of India achieve self-sufficiency and independence, and therefore used the charkha as a symbol of the Indian independence movement and included it on earlier versions of the Flag of India.

Great wheel

The great wheel was one of the earlier types of spinning wheel. The fibre is held in the left hand and the wheel slowly turned with the right. This wheel is thus good for using the long-draw spinning technique, which requires only one active hand most of the time, thus freeing a hand to turn the wheel. The great wheel is usually used to spin short-staple fibres (this includes both cotton and wool), and can only be used with fibre preparations that are suited to long-draw spinning.

The large drive wheel turns the much smaller spindle assembly, with the spindle revolving many times for each turn of the drive wheel. The yarn is spun at an angle off the tip of the spindle, and is then stored on the spindle. To begin spinning on a great wheel, first a leader (a length of waste yarn) is tied onto the base of the spindle and spiraled up to the tip. Then the spinner overlaps a handful of fibre with the leader, holding both gently together with the left hand, and begins to slowly turn the drive wheel clockwise with the right hand, while simultaneously walking backward and drawing the fibre in the left hand away from the spindle at an angle. The left hand must control the tension on the wool to produce an even result. Once a sufficient amount of yarn has been made, the spinner turns the wheel backward a short distance to unwind the spiral on the spindle, then turns it clockwise again, and winds the newly made yarn onto the spindle, finishing the wind-on by spiralling back out to the tip again to make another draw.

Treadle wheel

This type of wheel is powered by the spinner's foot rather than their hand or a motor. The spinner sits and pumps a foot treadle that turns the drive wheel via a crankshaft and a connecting rod. This leaves both hands free for drafting the fibres, which is necessary in the short draw spinning technique, which is often used on this type of wheel. The old-fashioned pointed driven spindle is not a common feature of the treadle wheel. Instead, most modern wheels employ a flyer-and-bobbin system which twists the yarn and winds it onto a spool simultaneously. These wheels can be single- or double-treadle; which is a matter of preference and does not affect the operation of the wheel.

Double drive

The double drive wheel is named after its drive band, which goes around the spinning wheel twice. The drive band turns the flyer, which is the horse-shoe shaped piece of wood surrounding the bobbin, as well as the bobbin. Due to a difference in the size of the whorls (the round pieces or pulleys around which the drive band runs) the bobbin whorl, which has a smaller radius than the flyer whorl, turns slightly faster. Thus both the flyer and bobbin rotate to twist the yarn, and the difference in speed continually winds the yarn onto the bobbin.  Generally the speed difference or "ratio" is adjusted by the size of the whorls and the tension of the drive band.

The drive band on the double drive wheel is generally made from a non-stretch yarn or twine; candlewick is also used.

Single drive

A single drive wheel has one drive band that  the flywheel and the flyer, and a short tension band which goes only over the bobbin.  The tension band adds an adjustable amount of drag to the bobbin and thereby increases the yarn take up force.

If the tension band was extremely tight and the bobbin could not rotate at all, yarn would be taken up onto the bobbin by the rotation of the flyer constantly at a rate of one wrap per revolution of the flyer.  In practice, the tension is set such that the bobbin can slip, but with some drag, generating the differential rate of rotation between the flyer and the bobbin.  This drag is the force which winds new yarn onto the bobbin.

While the spinner is making new yarn, the bobbin and the flyer turn in unison, driven by the single drive band. When the spinner feeds the yarn onto the bobbin, the drag on the flyer slows it and thus the yarn winds on. The tighter the tension band is, the more pull on the yarn, because the more friction the bobbin has to overcome to turn in sync with the flyer.

Upright style

When the spindle or flyer is located above the wheel, rather than off to one side, the wheel is said to be an upright wheel. This type of wheel is often more compact, thus easier to store. Some upright wheels are even made to fold up small enough that they fit in carry-on luggage at the airport. An Irish castle wheel is a type of upright in which the flyer is located below the drive wheel.

Electric spinning wheel
Electric spinning wheels or e-spinners are powered by an electric motor rather than via a treadle. Some require mains power while others may be powered by a low-voltage source, such as a rechargeable battery.  Most e-spinners are small and portable.

One of the attractions of an e-spinner is that it is not necessary to coordinate treadling with handling the fibre (drafting), so it is generally easier to learn to spin on an e-spinner than a traditional treadle-style spinning wheel.  E-spinners are also suitable for spinners who have trouble treadling for various reasons.

Importance

The spinning wheel increased the productivity of thread making by a factor of greater than 10.  Medieval historian Lynn Townsend White Jr. credited the spinning wheel with increasing the supply of rags, which led to cheap paper, which in turn was a factor in the development of printing.

It was fundamental to the cotton textile industry prior to the Industrial Revolution. It laid the foundations for later machinery such as the spinning jenny and spinning frame, which displaced the spinning wheel during the Industrial Revolution.

The spinning wheel was a precursor to the spinning jenny, which was widely used during the Industrial Revolution. The spinning jenny was essentially an adaptation of the spinning wheel.

Culture

The ubiquity of the spinning wheel has led to its inclusion in the art, literature and other expressions of numerous cultures around the world, and in the case of South Asia it has become a powerful political symbol.

Political Symbolism

Starting in 1931, the traditional spinning wheel became the primary symbol on the flag of the Provisional Government of Free India.

Mahatma Gandhi’s manner of dress and commitment to hand spinning were essential elements of his philosophy and politics. He chose the traditional loincloth as a rejection of Western culture and a symbolic identification with the poor of India. His personal choice became a powerful political gesture as he urged his more privileged followers to copy his example and discard—or even burn—their European-style clothing and return with pride to their ancient, pre-colonial culture. Gandhi claimed that spinning thread in the traditional manner also had material advantages, as it would create the basis for economic independence and the possibility of survival for India’s impoverished rural areas. This commitment to traditional cloth making was also part of a larger swadeshi movement, which aimed for the boycott of all British goods. As Gandhi explained to Charlie Chaplin in 1931, the return to spinning did not mean a rejection of all modern technology but of the exploitative and controlling economic and political system in which textile manufacture had become entangled. Gandhi said, “Machinery in the past has made us dependent on England, and the only way we can rid ourselves of the dependence is to boycott all goods made by machinery. This is why we have made it the patriotic duty of every Indian to spin his own cotton and weave his own cloth."

Literature and folk tales

The Golden Spinning Wheel (Zlatý kolovrat) is a Czech poem by Karel Jaromír Erben that was included in his classic collection of folk ballads, Kytice.

Rumpelstiltskin, one of the tales collected by the Brothers Grimm, revolves around a woman who is imprisoned under threat of execution unless she can spin straw into gold. Rumpelstiltskin helps her with this task, ultimately at the cost of her first-born child; however, she makes a new bargain with him and is able to keep her child after successfully guessing his name.

Another folk tale that incorporates spinning wheels is the classic fairy tale Sleeping Beauty, in which the main character pricks her hand or finger on the poisoned spindle of a spinning wheel and falls into a deep sleep following a wicked fairy or witch's curse. Numerous variations of the tale exist (the Brothers Grimm had one in their collection entitled Little Briar Rose), and in only some of them is the spindle actually attached to/associated with a spinning wheel.

Perhaps surprisingly, a traditional spindle does not have a sharp end that could prick a person's finger (unlike the walking wheel, often used for wool spinning). Despite this, the narrative idea persists that Sleeping Beauty or Briar Rose or Dornrosen pricks her finger on the spindle—a device which she has never seen before, as they have been banned from the kingdom in a forlorn attempt to prevent the curse of the wicked godmother-fairy.

Walt Disney included the Saxony or flax wheel in their animated film version of Perrault's tale and Rose pricks her finger on the distaff (which holds the plant fibre waiting to be spun). Whereas only a spindle is used in Tchaikovsky's ballet The Sleeping Beauty which is closer to the direct translation of the French "un fuseau".
Spinning wheels are also integral to the plot or characterization in the Scottish folk tale Habitrot and the German tales The Three Spinners. and The Twelve Huntsmen

Louisa May Alcott, most famous as the author of Little Women, wrote a collection of short stories called Spinning-Wheel Stories, which were not about spinning wheels but instead meant to be read while engaging in the rather tedious act of using a spinning wheel.

Music

Classical and symphonic
In 1814, Franz Schubert composed "Gretchen am Spinnrade", a lied for piano and voice based on a poem from Goethe's Faust. the piano part depicts Gretchen's restlessness as she spins on a spinning wheel while waiting by a window for her love to return.

Antonín Dvořák composed The Golden Spinning Wheel, a symphonic poem based on the folk ballad from Kytice by Karel Jaromír Erben.

Camille Saint-Saëns wrote Le Rouet d'Omphale (Omphale's Spinning Wheel), symphonic poem in A major, Op. 31, a musical treatment of the classical story of Omphale and Heracles.

A favorite piano work for students is Albert Ellmenreich's Spinnleidchen (Spinning Song), from his 1863 Musikalische Genrebilder, Op. 14. An ostinato of repeating melodic fifths represents the spinning wheel.

Folk and ballad
The Spinning Wheel is also the title/subject of a classic Irish folk song by John Francis Waller.

A traditional Irish folk song, Túirne Mháire, is generally sung in praise of the spinning wheel, but was regarded by Mrs Costelloe, who collected it, as "much corrupted", and may have had a darker narrative.  It is widely taught in junior schools in Ireland.

Sun Charkhe Di Mithi Mithi Kook is a Sufi song in the Punjabi language inspired by the traditional spinning wheel. It is an ode by a lover as she remembers her beloved with the sound of every spin of her Charkha.

Opera
Spinning wheels also feature prominently in the Wagner opera The Flying Dutchman; the second act begins with local girls sitting at their wheels and singing about the act of spinning.
Gilbert and Sullivan's The Yeomen of the Guard begins with a solitary character singing while spinning at her wheel, the first of their operettas not to open with a chorus.

Art
Spinning wheels may be found as motifs in art around the world, ranging from their status as domestic/utilitarian items to their more symbolic role (such as in India, where they may have political implications).

See also
 Ashoka Chakra
 Spindle (textiles)
 Spinners weasel
 Spinning (textiles)
 Spinning jenny
 National Charkha Museum

Citations

External links

Demonstration of spinning wheel (Video)
Demonstration of spinning wheel (video)
Free detailed plan for making wooden spinning wheel
Hand spinning wheels

Hand spinning tools
Indian inventions
National symbols of India
Articles containing video clips